Andrea Pellegrino and Mario Vilella Martínez were the defending champions but chose not to defend their title.

Colin Sinclair and Rubin Statham won the title after defeating Toshihide Matsui and Kaito Uesugi 6–4, 6–3 in the final.

Seeds

Draw

References

External links
 Main draw

Open Nouvelle-Calédonie - Doubles
2023 Doubles